Melvin Clyde Baker (born August 12, 1950) is a former American football wide receiver who played three seasons in the National Football League with the Miami Dolphins, New Orleans Saints, San Diego Chargers, New England Patriots and Houston Oilers. He was drafted by the Miami Dolphins in the eighth round of the 1974 NFL Draft. He played college football at Texas Southern University and attended Sam Houston High School in Houston, Texas. Baker was also a member of the St. Louis Cardinals and Buffalo Bills.

References

External links
Just Sports Stats

Living people
1950 births
Players of American football from Texas
American football wide receivers
African-American players of American football
Texas Southern Tigers football players
Miami Dolphins players
New Orleans Saints players
San Diego Chargers players
New England Patriots players
Houston Oilers players
Sportspeople from Beaumont, Texas
21st-century African-American people
20th-century African-American sportspeople